Nickell is both a surname and a given name. Notable people with the name include:

Elizabeth Nickell-Lean, mezzo-soprano
Francis M. Nickell, American politician
Joe Nickell, paranormal investigator
Matt Nickell, American soccer player
Nick Nickell, American bridge player
Stella Nickell, American criminal
Stephen Nickell, British economist and academic
Nickell Robey, American football player
Oliver Tree, Musician

See also
Murder of Rachel Nickell
Nickell Homestead and Mill, historic site
Nickell Memorial Armory, in Topeka, Kansas
Nickell Peak, mountain in Australia

Surnames from given names
Patronymic surnames